Nikola Zhivkov (Nikola Živkov) (1847 – 28 August 1901) was a Bulgarian educator. He founded the first kindergarten in Bulgaria and wrote the lyrics of Shumi Maritsa, national anthem of the country from 1886 until 1944. He was the brother of educator and women's rights activist Vela Blagoeva and politician .

References

1901 deaths
Bulgarian educators
People from Veliko Tarnovo
1847 births